John Ginty (born 1972) is an American organist, keyboard player, and session musician. He was a founding member of Robert Randolph's "Family Band", and is often seen guesting with such jamband luminaries as the Allman Brothers, Santana, Govt. Mule, Bob Weir and Ratdog, Widespread Panic. In 2001 at the Roseland Ballroom in New York, Ginty was the recipient of the Jammy Award for best new band alongside his Family Bandmates. Ginty has spent a large portion of his career working with many top artist as a session musician.

Biography
Ginty started his career playing a local New Jersey Band called "Rose Hill" where he transitioned from a drummer to playing the Hammond B3.  He played in this band from approximately 1991 till 1994. Then in 1996 he played organ on Neal Casal’s record “Fade Away Diamond Time”, which led him to play on records by Whiskeytown, James Iha, and Hazeldine, before joining Jewel’s touring band for MTV Unplugged, Saturday Night Live, the first Lilith Fair tour in 1998, and the following Papillion Tour in 1999. The following years saw him playing on records by Citizen Cope, Matthew Sweet, and Shannon McNally.

In 2000, Ginty got together with pedal steel player Robert Randolph, and helped him form the “Family Band”, which consisted of Randolph, Ginty, and Robert's cousins Danyel Morgan on bass, and Marcus Randolph on drums. After a year of touring, the Family Band released “Live At the Wetlands” in 2002. The album is a live recording of the band at the famed NYC club recorded by producer Jim Scott. The band recorded a studio follow-up in 2002 again with producer Jim Scott, called “Unclassified”, which garnered the band two Grammy nominations, one for best rock instrumental performance 46th Grammy Awards and for Best Rock Gospel Album. In that same year, the band backed the legendary Blind Boys of Alabama on the Grammy winning release “Higher Ground”. According to People Magazine, “John Ginty's organ nicely complement the Blind Boys' vigorous jubilee-style gospel, creating a sound that will indeed take you Higher. “

2004 saw Ginty playing on records by Bad Religion, Tift Merritt, Neal Casal, and “The Clarence Greenwood Recordings” by Citizen Cope, where Ginty is credited with playing Keyboards, Organ, Synthesizer, and Synthesizer Strings.
While continuing his session work and touring with Citizen Cope, in 2006 Ginty formed the New Jersey-based John Ginty Band. They released a live record called “Fireside Live”, recorded in Denville, NJ. It is the first recording to showcase Ginty as a bandleader. The recording includes guest performances by Ratdog's Mark Karan, and J.T. Thomas from Bruce Hornsby's Band. The record was released on Ginty's own label, Shark Tank Records.
Glide Magazine said of the record, “Fireside Live is loads of fun, as if Joey DeFrancesco or Jimmy Scott traded in the more academic jazz aesthetic (but retained same chops and improvisational proclivities) to front a boozy gospel-rock outfit Ginty’s taken to calling “outlaw gospel.”
He has played with such artists as Jewel, Matthew Sweet, Citizen Cope, Santana, Robert Randolph and the Family Band, Court Yard Hounds, the Dixie Chicks, and many others. as well as the critically acclaimed “Like A Bird, Like a Plane” by Charlie Mars.

In 2013, Ginty got together with producer Ben Elliott, and began work on his first official studio release, Bad News Travels. The record features special guests Warren Haynes, Martie Maguire, Neal Casal, Alecia Chakour, Albert Castiglia, Todd Wolfe, and Cris Jacobs. They recorded it at Elliott's Showplace Studios in Dover, N.J., on the vast collection of vintage analog gear that resides there.
“Bad News Travels” features ten songs, all written by Ginty, and was released September 12, 2013 on Elliotts American Showplace Music label. The new CD has garnered many favorable reviews. Relix Magazine said "Creating a seemingly effortless blend of blues, classic rock, funk and soul, Ginty utilizes his past experience as well as numerous special guests. One minute Todd Wolfe is confidently weaving a guitar solo in the smooth "Peanut Butter" and the next minute, vocalist Alecia Chakour is strutting about on the soulful and spunky "Seven & The Spirit."

Keyboard Magazine February 2014 issue featured lessons by John Ginty.
Several books mention John Ginty including Strangers Almanac by Michael Heaplie on page 47 which talk of Ginty's participation in the making of Ryan Adams' Whiskeytown, one of the biggest selling country music albums of all time. An excerpt from the book can be found here 
Another book to mention Ginty's important musical contributions is Jambands by Dean Budnick on page 182 

In 2013, Ginty was called upon again by Jim Scott to play on a record by the Court Yard Hounds called “Amelita”. He then joined the Dixie Chicks touring band, playing keyboards on their “Long Time Gone Tour”.

On June 11, 2014, John Ginty entered the Showplace Studios to record Bad News Travels Live DVD. Ginty recreated music from his Bad News Travels CD. Guesting were Albert Castiglia, Todd Wolfe, Cris Jacobs, Jimmy Bennett and Alexis P. Suter.

In November 2019, Ginty joined the newly formed Allman Betts Band.

Discography

References

1972 births
Living people
American male organists
American session musicians
21st-century American keyboardists
21st-century organists
21st-century American male musicians
American organists